Phostria ledereralis is a moth in the family Crambidae. It was described by Strand in 1920. It is found in Sierra Leone.

References

Phostria
Moths described in 1920
Moths of Africa